Bel Canto is a Norwegian music duo, originally a trio, fronted by vocalist Anneli Drecker, and signed originally to Crammed Discs.

Biography
Bel Canto was formed in 1985 in Tromsø by Geir Jenssen (synthesizer, programming), Nils Johansen (synthesizer, violin, bass guitar, guitar) and vocalist Anneli Drecker. The group was one of the first Norwegian bands to sign a record contract abroad. The trio moved to Brussels in 1986 and had their debut album White-Out Conditions released by Crammed Discs the following year. After a second album, Birds of Passage (1990), Jenssen left the band for a solo career as Biosphere. The group had a commercial breakthrough with Shimmering, Warm and Bright in 1992, and won the Spellemannprisen award twice, in 1992 and 1996. Their style evolved over time from an ethereal dream pop sound to synth-based pop influenced by world music. 

The group's first two records were licensed to Nettwerk Records Records in Canada and its second album was licensed to IRS/MCA Records.

During the years from 1985 to 2009, Bel Canto occasionally took breaks in order for Anneli Drecker to pursue a solo career and to perform with other bands and artists, as well as performing in films and theater plays. Nils Johansen composed music for film and television as well as working and performing with his other band, Vajas.

In 2007 Bel Canto continued to work together, both by writing new material and by doing more gigs. At the same time, both  Drecker and Johansen continued on other projects, Johansen with Vajas and Drecker on her solo work. Side-Line reported in March 2007 that Bel Canto would start work on a new album.

On 6 February 2009, Side-Line reported about a planned double album package called Maskindans: Norsk synth 1980–1988 that was to be released on Hommage Records. This release holds 158 minutes of music, 41 tracks, of which only one song was released on CD before. Included is also one previously unheard Bel Canto song, "Flowerbeds," which dates from 1988.

In 2017 Bel Canto performed at Øyafestivalen in Oslo, playing some of their careers best known songs in a near hour long set. In an interview Anneli Drecker said that the band was keen to do more live work and possibly record new songs.

Discography

Albums
 White-Out Conditions (1987)
 Birds of Passage (1989)
 Shimmering, Warm and Bright (1992)
 Magic Box (1996)
 Rush (French release titled Images) (1998)
 Dorothy's Victory (2002)
 Retrospect - compilation album (2001)

Singles

Drecker's solo albums
 Tundra (2000)
 Frolic (2005)
 Rocks and Straws (2015)
 Revelation For Personal Use (2017)

References

External links

 General
 BelCanto.no – Official page
 AnneliDrecker.com – Official fan page of lead singer Anneli Drecker

 Discographies
 [ Bel Canto discography] at AMG
 Bel Canto discography at Music-City

Norwegian electronic music groups
Norwegian musical duos
Dream pop musical groups
Spellemannprisen winners
Lava Records artists
EMI Records artists
I.R.S. Records artists
Columbia Records artists
Musical groups established in 1985
1985 establishments in Norway
Musical groups from Tromsø